Tira K'ark'a (Aymara tira cradle, k'ark'a crevice, fissure, crack, also spelled Tirakarka) is a mountain in the Cordillera Real in the Andes of Bolivia, about  high. It lies in the La Paz Department, Los Andes Province, Batallas Municipality. Tira K'ark'a is situated at the lake Q'ara Quta south-west of the mountain Phaq'u Kiwuta.

See also
 Kimsa Chata

References 

Mountains of La Paz Department (Bolivia)